Claiborne Academy is a private, non-profit, pre-kindergarten through 12th grade school located in unincorporated Claiborne Parish, Louisiana, near Haynesville.  It was founded in 1969 as a segregation academy.

Claiborne Academy was founded in 1969 by a group of citizens from Claiborne Parish, including Ramond W. Birdsong, and William M. Rainach.

Mr. Birdsong was a hard worker and financial backer on many aspects of the initial construction. He was instrumental in the construction of the football stadium, Gymnasium and many other buildings that still stand today.

Rainach, a Louisiana state legislator and White Citizens' Council leader.  Rainach also established the Claiborne Academy Foundation and raised money for the school for many years.

The school opened in the 1969–1970 academic year on two campuses: one in Haynesville and one in Homer. The present campus was built in 1970 and began operation in the 1970–1971 school year. Many additions and improvements have since been made.

The school is accredited by the State of Louisiana and the Mississippi Association of Independent Schools, as well as holding Brumfield-Dodd status and participation in the State of Louisiana TOPS tuition program. The school was a member of the Louisiana Independent School Association until 1992.

Athletics

Championships
Football championships
(3) LISA State Championships: 1981, 1987, 1990 
(1) MAIS State Championships: 2004

References

External links

 Official website

Private high schools in Louisiana
Private middle schools in Louisiana
Private elementary schools in Louisiana
Schools in Claiborne Parish, Louisiana
Segregation academies in Louisiana